In mathematics, more precisely in measure theory, an atom is a measurable set which has positive measure and contains no set of smaller positive measure. A measure which has no atoms is called non-atomic or atomless.

Definition

and for any measurable subset  with

the set  has measure zero.

If  is a -finite measure, there are countably many atomic classes.

Examples
 Consider the set X = {1, 2, ..., 9, 10} and let the sigma-algebra  be the power set of X. Define the measure  of a set to be its cardinality, that is, the number of elements in the set. Then, each of the singletons {i}, for i = 1, 2, ..., 9, 10 is an atom.
 Consider the Lebesgue measure on the real line. This measure has no atoms.

Atomic measures
A -finite measure  on a measurable space  is called atomic or purely atomic if every measurable set of positive measure contains an atom. This is equivalent to say that there is a countable partition of  formed by atoms up to a null set. The assumption of -finitude is essential. Consider otherwise the space  where  denotes the counting measure. This space is atomic, with all atoms being the singletons, yet the space is not able to be partitioned into the disjoint union of countably many disjoint atoms,  and a null set  since the countable union of singletons is a countable set, and the uncountability of the real numbers shows that the complement  would have to be uncountable, hence its -measure would be infinite, in contradiction to it being a null set. The validity of the result for -finite spaces follows from the proof for finite measure spaces by observing that the countable union of countable unions is again a countable union, and that the countable unions of null sets are null.

Discrete measures
A -finite atomic measure  is called discrete if the intersection of the atoms of any atomic class is non empty. 
We can chose each point  to be a common point of the atoms
in the -th atomic class.

Then there is a single atomic class, the one formed by the co-countable subsets. The measure  is atomic but the intersection of the atoms in the unique atomic class is empty and  can't be put as a sum of Dirac measures.

If every atom is equivalent to a singleton,  is discrete iff it is atomic. Any finite measure in a separable metric space provided with the Borel sets satisfies this condition.

Non-atomic measures
In other words, a measure  is non-atomic if for any measurable set  with  there exists a measurable subset  of  such that

A non-atomic measure with at least one positive value has an infinite number of distinct values, as starting with a set  with  one can construct a decreasing sequence of measurable sets

such that

This may not be true for measures having atoms; see the first example above.

It turns out that non-atomic measures actually have a continuum of values.

there exists a measurable subset  of  such that

This theorem is due to Wacław Sierpiński.
It is reminiscent of the intermediate value theorem for continuous functions.

Sketch of proof of Sierpiński's theorem on non-atomic measures. A slightly stronger statement, which however makes the proof easier, is that if  is a non-atomic measure space and  there exists a function  that is monotone with respect to inclusion, and a right-inverse to  That is, there exists a one-parameter family of measurable sets  such that for all 
 

The proof easily follows from Zorn's lemma applied to the set of all monotone partial sections to  :

See also 
 Atom (order theory) — an analogous concept in order theory
 Dirac delta function
 Elementary event, also known as an atomic event

Notes

References

External links

 Atom at The Encyclopedia of Mathematics

Measure theory